Labzov, Labzoff or Labzow (masculine), or Labzova (feminine) is one of surnames in Russia and former Soviet states. 
The surname comes from the word "labza", the Old Russian name for a barn or flour rows. Another meaning is flatterer or deceiver.

People with the surname
Artsiom Labzov, Belarus ice hockey referee on International competitions in 2020, 2018, 2017
Leonid Labzov, Soviet and Russian ice hockey player

References

Russian-language surnames
Surnames of Russian origin